Cannons Mill is an unincorporated community in Columbiana County, in the U.S. state of Ohio.

History
A post office called Cannons Mill was established in 1842, and remained in operation until 1902. Besides the post office, the community had its namesake Cannon's Mills, a gristmill.

References

Unincorporated communities in Columbiana County, Ohio
1842 establishments in Ohio
Populated places established in 1842
Unincorporated communities in Ohio